Keys Glacier is a glacier flowing northeast from Jenkins Heights between Ellis Ridge and Mount Bray on the Bakutis Coast of Marie Byrd Land, Antarctica. It was mapped by the United States Geological Surveyfrom surveys and U.S. Navy aerial photographs, 1959–67, and was named by the Advisory Committee on Antarctic Names in 1977 after Keith W. Keys, U.S. Navy, an air controller at Williams Field, McMurdo Sound, 1975–76.

References

Glaciers of Marie Byrd Land